Edward Frank Kolar (April 30, 1909 – March 5, 1988) was an American professional basketball player. He played for the Sheboygan Red Skins in the National Basketball League for one game during the 1938–39 season.

He was the brother of Otto Kolar, who played alongside him during Eddie's one game stint for the Red Skins.

References

1909 births
1988 deaths
American men's basketball players
Basketball players from Chicago
Guards (basketball)
People from Bartlett, Illinois
People from Cicero, Illinois
Sheboygan Red Skins players